Diego Martín Rolle (born 2 February 1985) is an Argentine professional footballer who plays as an attacking midfielder for Guillermo Brown.

On 16 July 2019, he joined the Italian Serie C club Gozzano.

On 18 August 2020, he joined theGreek Super League 2 club Ionikos.

References

External links
 Profile at BDFA 
 

1985 births
Living people
Argentine footballers
Argentine expatriate footballers
Guillermo Brown de Puerto Madryn footballers
Comisión de Actividades Infantiles footballers
Olimpo footballers
San Lorenzo de Almagro footballers
Unión de Santa Fe footballers
Arsenal de Sarandí footballers
PAE Kerkyra players
Asteras Tripolis F.C. players
O'Higgins F.C. footballers
A.C. Gozzano players
Ionikos F.C. players
Argentine Primera División players
Primera Nacional players
Chilean Primera División players
Super League Greece players
Serie C players
Argentine expatriate sportspeople in Chile
Argentine expatriate sportspeople in Greece
Argentine expatriate sportspeople in Italy
Expatriate footballers in Chile
Expatriate footballers in Greece
Expatriate footballers in Italy
Association football midfielders